Thanasis Pakhoumas (born 21 February 1966) is a Greek sailor. He competed at the 1992 Summer Olympics and the 2004 Summer Olympics.

References

External links
 

1966 births
Living people
Greek male sailors (sport)
Olympic sailors of Greece
Sailors at the 1992 Summer Olympics – 470
Sailors at the 2004 Summer Olympics – 49er
Place of birth missing (living people)